For Aeons Past is the debut studio album by Swedish metal band Solution .45. It was released in Europe on 24 March 2010, and in North America on 11 May 2010.  On 15 February 2010 Solution .45 released the track "Gravitational Lensing" for free download.

The album features lyrics and guest vocals from Dark Tranquillity singer Mikael Stanne.

Track listing
All music written by Jani Stefanovic & Christian Älvestam; except where noted
All lyrics written by Mikael Stanne; except where noted

Personnel

Band members
 Christian Älvestam - vocals
 Jani Stefanovic - lead and rhythm guitars
 Tom Gardiner - lead and rhythm guitars
 Rolf Pilve - drums
 Anders Edlund - bass

Guests
 Mikko Härkin - keyboards
 Mikael Stanne - backing vocals, lyrics
 Patrik Gardberg - guitars

References

2010 debut albums
AFM Records albums
Albums with cover art by Pär Olofsson
Solution .45 albums